The number of national daily newspapers in Iceland was just five in 1950 and in 1965. This is a list of both current and defunct newspapers in Iceland:

Current daily newspapers
 Fréttablaðið – founded in 2001
 Morgunblaðið – founded in 1913

Current weekly newspapers
 DV – merger of Dagblaðið and Vísir in 1981
 The Reykjavík Grapevine – describes itself as a newspaper; publishes some 18 issues a year
 Skessuhorn – weekly news for the West Coast of Iceland
 Vikudagur – weekly news for the North of Iceland
 Viðskiptablaðið – weekly business newspaper

Current bi-weekly newspapers
 Heimildin – founded in 2023 with the merger of Stundin and Kjarninn
 Bændablaðið – founded in 1995

Current online newspapers
IceNews
 Viljinn

Defunct
 24 stundir – formerly known as Blaðið
 Alþýðublaðið – social-democratic newspaper
 Dagblaðið – founded in 1975, merged with Vísir in 1981 as Dagblaðið-Vísir or DV
 Dagur
 Eintak – weekly newspaper
 Fréttatíminn – founded 2010; weekly news for the capital area
 Helgarpósturinn – weekly newspaper
 Ísafold
 Kjarninn – online newspaper; merged with Stundin in 2023
 Pressan – weekly newspaper
 Þjóðviljinn – socialist newspaper; 1936–1992
 Stundin – bi-weekly newspapers founded in 2015 by former staff of DV; merged with Kjarninn]] in 2023
 Tíminn – agrarian daily; the Progressive Party
 Vikublaðið – weekly socialist newspaper
 Vísir – founded in 1910 initially as a right-wing newspaper; merged with Dagblaðið'' in 1981

See also
 List of online newspapers in Iceland

References

List
Iceland
Newspapers